Nemocephalus is a genus of beetles belonging to the family Brentidae.

The species of this genus are found in Central America.

Species:
 Nemocephalus avarus (Kleine, 1927) 
 Nemocephalus enodis (Kleine, 1927)

References

Brentidae